Dózsa MaDISz Torna Egylet was a Hungarian football club from Budapest, Hungary.

History
Dózsa MaDISz TE debuted in the 1945–46 season of the Hungarian League and finished fourteenth .

Name Changes 
1945–1946: IX. ker. Dózsa MaDISz
1946–1948: Budapesti Partizán Sport Club
1948: dissolved

References

External links
 Profile

Football clubs in Hungary
Defunct football clubs in Hungary